The Dance Band Days was a weekly half hour programme on BBC radio of predominantly British dance band recordings of the 1920s to early 1940s. It ran from 1969 to 1999, eventually settling in a regular early evening slot on Mondays, and was introduced, until his death, by Alan Dell. Malcolm Laycock then took over until the programme’s content was subsumed in Sunday Night at 10, a late night programme on Radio 2 on Sunday evenings, presented by Malcolm Laycock, although the Dance Bands part of the programme was discontinued in 2008. The programmes were recorded off-air from FM broadcasts.

References

BBC Radio 2 programmes